Wake is the third full-length studio album by Christian hard rock band Mortal. For this album, the band moved away from industrial and embraced a more alternative rock-based sound. The album reached No. 21 on the Billboard Top Contemporary Christian chart.

Track listing
Paradigm One (5:38)
June First (3:44)
Mother's Day (4:12)
Vial (2:51)
Filter (4:11)
Speed of Sound (4:46)
Oceanful (5:35)
Serpent-Teen (3:28)
Moons and Suns (3:00)
Fall (0:56)
Sold (6:19)
God of 3 Strings (2:15)
Nowhere Man (2:42)
To My Darling Whippoorwill (2:06)

Personnel
Jyro Xhan
Jerome Fontamillas
Johann Fontamillas - vocals
Ed Benrock - drums, percussion
Mark - keyboards
Hernane Mayang - vocals
Andrew D. Prickett - guitar
Holly S. - vocals
Troy Yasuda - guitar

References

1994 albums
Mortal (band) albums